Mary Scott McKee ( Harrison; April 3, 1858 – October 28, 1930) was the only daughter of  Benjamin Harrison, the 23rd president of the United States, and his wife Caroline Scott Harrison outside of her infant sister who died shortly after birth.

After her mother died in 1892, McKee served as her father's First Lady for the remainder of his term.

Married with children by the time her father was elected as president, Mary and her family lived at the White House during her father's term. She assisted by serving as a hostess.

Early life and education
Mary Scott Harrison was born in Indianapolis in 1858 and was educated in public schools.

Marriage and family

In November 1884, Mary Harrison married James Robert McKee (1857–1942), a native of Madison, Indiana, whom she met in Indianapolis. After her father was elected president in 1888, she and her family lived with her parents in the White House through his term.

Traveling frequently to Boston on business, McKee became acquainted with Charles A. Coffin and joined his Thomson-Houston Electric Company. In 1893 McKee became one of the founding generation of the General Electric company when Coffin merged his company with that of Thomas Edison. McKee rose to become a vice-president of the company and worked for GE until 1913.

Mary and James McKee had two children, Benjamin Harrison McKee (known as "Baby") and Mary Lodge McKee. Their daughter married a Mr. Reisinger.

Acting First Lady
Following her mother's death in October 1892, Mary McKee served as her father's First Lady for the remainder of his term. He was defeated for re-election.

Family estrangement

As a widower, her father became romantically involved with his late wife's niece and secretary, young widow Mary Dimmick, who was 25 years younger than Benjamin Harrison, 27 days younger than Mary Harrison McKee, and was a first cousin of Benjamin's children. 

Mary McKee and her brother opposed their father's relationship and remarriage. McKee became estranged from her father, and neither she nor her brother attended the Harrison-Dimmick wedding in 1896. McKee and her father never spoke again. She returned to Indianapolis in his final illness in March 1901, but arrived several hours after his death.

Later years
Mary McKee died at the age of 72 in Greenwich, Connecticut. She was buried at Crown Hill Cemetery in Indianapolis, Indiana, as her parents had been. Her husband survived her, living independently in Greenwich, Connecticut, near their married daughter, Mary Lodge Reisinger, and her family. According to his note, James McKee was despondent because of failing health and required surgery; he committed suicide at age 84 in October 1942.

References
 Original text based on First Ladies: "Mary Harrison McKee", White House biography

1858 births
1930 deaths
19th-century American women
20th-century American women
Acting first ladies of the United States
Benjamin Harrison
Burials at Crown Hill Cemetery
Children of presidents of the United States
Harrison family of Virginia
People from Indianapolis